The men's 800 metres event at the 2002 African Championships in Athletics was held in Radès, Tunisia on August 9–10.

Medalists

Results

Heats

Final

References

2002 African Championships in Athletics
800 metres at the African Championships in Athletics